Rosa Delia Cota Montaño (born 23 April 1951) is a Mexican politician from the Labor Party. From 2000 to 2003 she served as Deputy of the LVIII Legislature of the Mexican Congress representing Baja California Sur.

References

1951 births
Living people
Politicians from Baja California Sur
Women members of the Chamber of Deputies (Mexico)
Members of the Chamber of Deputies (Mexico)
Labor Party (Mexico) politicians
21st-century Mexican politicians
21st-century Mexican women politicians
People from Los Cabos Municipality